Saint Xavier High School (often abbreviated St. X) is a private, college-preparatory high school just outside the Cincinnati city limits, in the Finneytown neighborhood of Springfield Township, Hamilton County, Ohio, United States. The independent, non-diocesan school is operated by the Midwest Province of the Society of Jesus as one of four all-male Catholic high schools in the Archdiocese of Cincinnati. Aside from colleges and universities, St. Xavier is the second-largest private school in Ohio and one of the 100 largest schools in the state, with 1,366 enrolled students .

St. Xavier is the oldest high school in the Cincinnati area and one of the oldest in the nation. It grew out of the Athenaeum, which opened in 1831 in downtown Cincinnati. From 1869 to 1934, the high school program formed the lower division of St. Xavier College, now Xavier University. The high school moved to its present location in 1960.

The Bombers football team and Aquabombers swimming and diving team have a national profile, appearing frequently at state championships and in national rankings. Graduates of St. Xavier include numerous professional athletes, three Olympians, prominent state and national politicians, influential businessmen, and noted authors and actors.

History

Downtown origins

St. Xavier, once a part of Xavier University, traces its history to the Athenaeum at Seventh and Sycamore streets in Downtown Cincinnati. The institute, which included a seminary and lay college, was dedicated by the first bishop of Cincinnati, the Most Rev. Edward D. Fenwick, O.P., on October 17, 1831. It was the first Catholic institution of higher learning in the Northwest Territory. Just a week later, the city's first public high school, Woodward College, opened its doors. The Athenaeum stood until 1890, next door to The Catholic Telegraphs printing press.

In 1840, at the behest of Bishop Fenwick, the Society of Jesus began operating the Athenaeum's lay college, which it renamed St. Xavier College, after St. Francis Xavier. The Congregation of the Mission (Vincentians) took over the seminary in 1841, and the college was granted a 30-year state charter in 1842. St. Xavier College originally offered six years of integrated primary, secondary, and post-secondary education, in keeping with the Ratio Studiorum and the original Jesuit college in Messina, Sicily, predecessor to the University of Messina. Day schoolers came from all over the city, while boarders hailed from the Deep South, Mexico, and Cuba. School closed on Thursdays and Sundays until 1917. Originally, until 1851, admission was granted to students ages 8 to 16. Later, a tuition-free elementary school division opened to complement the college. In 1844, the school's elementary division opened a boarding school campus in Walnut Hills but was forced to close its doors two years later and return downtown.

In the 1850s, falling enrollment, threat of bankruptcy, and cholera brought about proposals to close the high school division. Jesuit schools had opened in the South, contributing to declining enrollment. The situation was worsened by the local anti-Catholic and Know Nothing sentiment that culminated in the Cincinnati riot of 1853. Beginning the fall of 1854, St. Xavier stopped admitting boarders altogether, becoming a primarily local institute, to reduce the financial burden on its students' families.

On May 7, 1869, St. Xavier's charter was extended in perpetuity by an act of the General Assembly. Later that year, the school began distinguishing between academic and collegiate departments. Three years of high school would be followed by one year each of the humanities, poetry, rhetoric, and philosophy.

At the close of the 19th century, St. Xavier's athletic teams competed in the Interscholastic Athletic Association of Cincinnati.

Expansion and separation

In 1910, St. Xavier College transitioned to an American-style eight-year program. Some students took typing classes at the St. Xavier Commercial School nearby. On October 1, 1906, another branch campus opened in Walnut Hills. This time, St. Xavier Branch High School or "St. Xavier on the Hill" served first- and second-year high school students. Tuition was $60 downtown and $80 at the suburban location (equivalent to $ and $, respectively, in ). Classes were held in Walnut Hills until December 1911.

In 1912, the Branch High School moved into the Avondale Athletic Club in North Avondale and became Xavier Academy. On September 10, 1919, Xavier Academy closed as the College of Arts and Sciences moved into its campus. However, science classes remained at the high school downtown, for the time being, as did the evening classes from the Schools of Law, Commerce, and Sociology.

In the late 1920s, St. Xavier High School began competing against Elder, Purcell, and Roger Bacon high schools in baseball, basketball, and football. On October 6, 1931, the four schools founded the Greater Cincinnati League, known today as the Greater Catholic League.

On August 4, 1930, the college became Xavier University, to reflect its transition to the American university model and garner more prestige ahead of its centennial the next year. St. Xavier High School formally split with St. Xavier College in 1934, with Fr. Aloysius J. Diersen, S.J., serving as the High School's first president, but the two schools continued to share resources. Xavier's School of Education conducted practice teaching at St. Xavier. Also, St. Xavier's senior classes studied under Xavier professors in Avondale from 1944 to 1946, to compensate for Xavier's loss of cadets from the Army Air Corps 30th College Training Detachment during World War II.

Finneytown relocation and recent history

St. Xavier began its move from the original location in downtown Cincinnati in April 1955 when its president, Fr. John J. Benson, S.J., purchased a  plot in Finneytown. In September 1960, St. Xavier High School moved into its newly built facilities, designed by local architect Albert Walters, in unincorporated Springfield Township. At the time, the facilities were nicknamed the "Finneytown Hilton" for their price tag of over $ (equivalent to $ in ). The original high school building was later torn down and is now the site of a parking lot.

In 1965, St. Xavier produced its first three African-American graduates, Phil Cox, Michael Walker, and Peter D. Samples. The same school year, Myron Kilgore was hired as the school's first African-American faculty member.

Since its move away from downtown, St. Xavier has expanded its facilities dramatically. In 1969, the school added Keating Natatorium, which featured a $500,000 Olympic-size swimming pool (equivalent to $ in ). St. Xavier's worship space was replaced by Xavier Hall, a multipurpose facility, in 1986. In 1998, a $ expansion project moved science classes from the basement into a new, three-story wing and added the Holy Companions Chapel and a dedicated intramural gym. During the 2003–04 school year, St. Xavier renovated the football stadium around Ballaban Field, which was built in the late 1960s, and renamed it Ballaban Field at St. Xavier Stadium. Along with the stadium, the school opened a 500-seat theater space, as well as a black box theater, art studios, and renovated music rooms. A new track field replaced the track that once surrounded Ballaban Field. St. Xavier also converted the former Girls' Town of America location across the street into its "South Campus", which includes new baseball and soccer fields. The school added a makerspace in the fall of 2017.

On December 15, 2017, St. Xavier named its first lay president, Tim Reilly, who succeeded Fr. Tim A. Howe, S.J., in July 2018. Until then, all of St. Xavier's presidents had been ordained members of the Society of Jesus.

In 2018, two priests affiliated with St. Xavier during the mid-1960s were named in the Midwest Jesuits' list of clergy members accused of sexual abuse. In 2020, the school removed a chaplain upon receiving allegations of abuse by him during the 1990s.

During the COVID-19 pandemic, St. Xavier returned to in-person learning as soon as the stay-at-home order was lifted. The school credited this policy with increased enrollment.

In March 2021, RDI Corporation, a Blue Ash–based outsourcing firm, gave the school $ to endow its football program. In recognition, St. Xavier Stadium was renamed RDI Stadium. In August 2021, Keating Natatorium reopened after a $ renovation.

In 2022, the Midwest Jesuits established Xavier Jesuit Academy in Bond Hill to serve underprivileged students in the third through eighth grades. Its planned opening in 2024 would mark the first time the Jesuits provided elementary school education in Cincinnati since St. Xavier Elementary School in the 1850s.

Academics
, St. Xavier has 1,366 enrolled students, the most of any Catholic high school in an area with the nation's second-highest private school attendance rate. Tuition is US $16,600.00 for the 2022–23 school year. According to St. Xavier, tuition is $1,000 less than the cost of educating a student there. During the 2022–23 school year, more than 58% of students received financial aid. In 2020, students received $ in financial aid. St. Xavier accepts school vouchers from the Ohio Educational Choice Scholarship Program (EdChoice).

The faculty consists of 120 full-time teachers, including six Jesuit priests. Eighty six percent of the faculty have a master's degree or higher. Four full-time staff members assist with Individualized Education Programs.

Admissions and demographics
Students apply to St. Xavier High School by taking the High School Placement Test (HSPT) and submitting an elementary school transcript, teacher recommendations, and an enrollment application. Other factors are also taken into account. , approximately 56% of freshman applicants are admitted, down from 70% in 2014. About a quarter of these students are admitted due to legacy, defined as an alumnus or current student in the applicant's immediate family.

Students come to St. Xavier from throughout Greater Cincinnati, Southeastern Indiana, and Northern Kentucky. , students of color make up 20% of the student body, up from 12% in 2015. About 80% are Roman Catholic.

In addition to students from the Greater Cincinnati area, St. Xavier admits students from overseas through various foreign exchange programs, such as American Field Service. In particular, partner school Col·legi Casp–Sagrat Cor de Jesús in Barcelona has sent students to St. Xavier and received them into its  (baccalaureate) program since 1995.

Curriculum and scheduling
All students at St. Xavier are part of the school's college preparatory program, requiring 23½ credit units for graduation. The program is accredited by AdvancED, the Ohio Catholic School Accrediting Association, and the Ohio Department of Education. Students are not ranked. Grade point averages are computed on an unweighted 100-point scale, which can be converted to a standard 4.0 scale.

The college preparatory program encompasses a variety of subject areas as part of an emphasis on cura personalis ("well-rounded individuals"). , the school offers 27 electives aligned with Advanced Placement curricula:

 Biology
 Calculus AB
 Calculus BC
 Chemistry
 Chinese Language and Culture
 Computer Science A
 Computer Science Principles
 English Language and Composition
 English Literature and Composition
 Environmental Science
 European History
 French Language and Culture
 German Language and Culture
 Human Geography
 Latin
 Macroeconomics
 Music Theory
 Physics 1
 Physics C
 Psychology
 Spanish Language and Culture
 Statistics
 Studio Art Drawing
 Studio Art 2D
 U.S. History
 U.S. Government and Politics
 World History

As a Roman Catholic school, St. Xavier requires all students to study various aspects of religion and theology each year.

St. Xavier students may receive credit for work completed at the school's partners, Canisius-Kolleg Berlin and Xavier University. During the summers of even-numbered years, a Marine Science elective is offered to St. Xavier students at Hawaii Preparatory Academy in Waimea, Hawaii County, Hawaii. In partnership with the Confucius Institute at Miami University, St. Xavier opened the region's first Confucius Classroom in 2016 to support its Chinese language program.

Freshmen are organized into five houses for the purposes of academic scheduling and guidance counseling.

The school year begins in August and ends in May. It is divided into two semesters for grading and course scheduling purposes, but exams are administered quarterly. An ordinary school day begins at 8:00 am and ends at 3:05 pm. The school day is divided into eight periods. Although students register for 6–7 classes in a quarter, only six meet on any given day. Classes are not assigned to a specific period; instead, they rotate in a round-robin schedule designed to reduce stress. Additionally, two days dubbed "X and Y days" are often set aside for block scheduling, to allow for classroom material that would not otherwise fit into a normal-length class period. An iOS application named XSchedule is available for keeping track of the current day's schedule.

From 2011 to 2017, St. Xavier students were permitted to use personal laptops, tablets, and smartphones at school under a voluntary bring your own device policy. Beginning with the class of 2018, St. Xavier phased in a one to one computing policy in which students are required to own an iPad for use at school. However, beginning with the class of 2021, the school has reverted to a bring your own laptop policy that excludes Apple devices including the iPad.

Recognition and graduation
Each year, a number of St. Xavier students receive honors from standardized testing programs. From 1970 to 2012, 1,000 students were named semifinalists or finalists in the National Merit Scholarship Program. In 2018, 16 seniors were commended and 17 were named finalists in the program. The same year, 603 students took 1,076 Advanced Placement exams. For their high scores, 91 earned Scholar Awards, 46 with honor, 80 with distinction, and of them seven were named National AP Scholars, the highest distinction awarded. In 2006, a record 137 students received Scholar Awards. The class of 2018 posted an average ACT score of 29.2, the highest in the school's history, with five perfect scores. Nine students in the class of 2019 posted a perfect score. The class of  posted an average ACT score of 28.6 and an average SAT score of 1324, earning 14 students National Merit Finalist status. That year, 550 students took 998 Advanced Placement exams. For their high scores, 77 earned Scholar Awards, 34 with honor, 127 with distinction, the highest distinction awarded after the National AP Scholar award was discontinued in 2020.

The U.S. Department of Education recognized the school itself as a Blue Ribbon School for the 1983–84 and 1984–85 school years. In 1984, St. Xavier was one of 60 schools recognized by the Council on American Private Education's Exemplary Private School Recognition Project, which surveyed 358 schools nationwide.

Graduation exercises are held at the Cintas Center in late May. On average, about six percent of students in a given class year leave St. Xavier before graduation. Of those who graduate, 99% enter a four-year college or university and 82% are admitted into their first choice school. The University of Cincinnati, Ohio State University, and Miami University received the most students from the classes of 2008–2012. The class of 2018 has matriculated into 82 colleges and universities. According to BusinessWeek, nearly a third of the Class of 2004 pursued a major in business. In 2007, St. Xavier published a directory of over 16,000 living alumni, listing "511 living graduates as medical doctors or dentists, 624 as attorneys, and 610 as engineers".

School traditions
As a member of the Jesuit Schools Network, St. Xavier shares many Jesuit traditions with other secondary institutions run by the Society of Jesus. For example, graduating students are expected to have acquired the five characteristics defined in the "Graduate at Graduation" profile: Open to Growth, Intellectually Competent, Religious, Loving, and Committed to Justice.

The school holds school-wide Masses on holy days of obligation and other important events, as well as optional daily Mass in Holy Companions Chapel at the center of campus.

Ignatian retreats are offered frequently at St. Xavier. Besides class-wide programs held at the Jesuit Spiritual Center in Milford, optional retreats include Knightwatch for sophomores and Kairos, which was introduced in February 1985 for seniors.

Alma mater
St. Xavier's alma mater is adapted from that of another Jesuit high school, St. Ignatius High School in Cleveland; in 1958, St. Ignatius gave St. Xavier permission to adapt the song. St. Xavier modified the final two lines, which refer to the school name and colors. This adaptation is sung after school assemblies, athletic events, and commencement exercises.

Fundraising

St. Xavier's financial aid program benefits from a pair of annual fundraisers, each held annually since 1973. The Walk For X is a  student walkathon through Finneytown neighborhoods that preempts classes once a year. The X-Travaganza is a themed dinner auction modeled after that of Loyola Academy in Chicago.

In 2018, the 132nd Ohio General Assembly authorized the Bureau of Motor Vehicles to issue a specialty license plate bearing St. Xavier's logo and the words "The Long Blue Line", referring to the school's alumni. Proceeds from registration fees benefit the school's tuition assistance and guidance counseling programs.

Campus

St. Xavier's  suburban campus is located to the north and south of West North Bend Road, bounded by the Cincinnati College of Mortuary Science to the south, Ronald Reagan Cross County Highway to the north, and residential areas to the east and west.

The school grounds include a wooded walking trail, a mock courtroom, and a school history exhibit. The Fred Middendorf, S.J., Nature Trail runs about a third of a mile (0.54 km) behind the athletic fields. Indoors, the Mock Trial team makes use of a specially built classroom that imitates the layout of a courtroom. Along the school's main hallways, recent student artwork hangs beside the Living Walls project, a graphical timeline accompanying 90 years of class photos. St. Xavier maintains 11 computer labs with over 330 computers available for student use. The school library, named for alumnus and Ohio state representative John D. "Jay" Carroll III, contains 23,000 volumes. A makerspace in the Fine Arts wing offers student access to single-board microcontrollers, CNC machines, 3D printers, and large-format printers.

St. Xavier's Finneytown campus features athletic facilities comparable to most colleges, including a new football stadium and indoor swimming pool which it shares with the Cincinnati Marlins. The olympic-size swimming pool seats 626. The school has one of the largest tennis court complexes in the area. St. Xavier's soccer field was home to the now-defunct Cincinnati Cheetahs professional soccer team during their 1994 season.

The school's most prominent art installation is the sculpture Open End, a 1983 work by Australian sculptor Clement Meadmore.

Extracurricular activities

Athletics

St. Xavier's large athletic program was ranked 13th in the nation in 2008 by Sports Illustrated. The school offers 17 Division I athletic programs – baseball, basketball, bowling, cross country, football, golf, hockey, lacrosse, rugby union, Discusses conversion of the North Bend Rugby Club into an official school team, originally in Division II. soccer, swimming and diving, tennis, track and field, volleyball, water polo, and wrestling. The teams are members of the Greater Catholic League (GCL). As one of four all-male institutions that participate in the GCL's South Division, St. Xavier competes with nearby Elder, La Salle, and Moeller high schools.

St. Xavier's sports teams were originally nicknamed the "Conquistadors", or "Conquerors". Eventually, the teams came to be known as the Bombers. Competing explanations of the name change credit American success in World War II, "bombs" thrown by George Ratterman to Charley Wolf in football or basketball games, and a corruption of the nickname given to Jesuit missionaries in World War II, the "Balmers". The Cincinnati Enquirer first referred to St. Xavier's basketball team as the "Bombers" on January 19, 1944; however, it continued to refer to the football team as the "Conquerors" through the end of the year.

The official school mascot is "Benny the Bomber", a bomber pilot. He was reintroduced in 2019 after a 22-year hiatus. Another school mascot is the "Blue Monster" – a shaggy, Muppet-like mascot that takes its name from the student cheering section – appears at games wearing a Bomber football jersey.

Bomber games are often broadcast on Waycross Community Media. Football games are simulcast on Fox Sports Radio affiliate WSAI, clear-channel ESPN Radio affiliate WCKY, and iHeartRadio.

, 1,178 St. Xavier students were eligible to participate in OHSAA-sanctioned competitions, placing the school in the AAA boys class for the 2017–18 and 2018–19 school years. OHSAA bylaws prohibit residents of Kentucky and Indiana from competing. In 1985, a lawsuit was filed against OHSAA and St. Xavier on behalf of four St. Xavier students who were residents of Kentucky, claiming that the rule violated the Privileges and Immunities Clause of the United States Constitution. The United States Court of Appeals for the Sixth Circuit affirmed the rule in Alerding v. Ohio High School Athletic Association.

Swimming and diving

St. Xavier has fielded a swimming team, known as the "Aquabombers", since 1930. The team began to win statewide titles in 1970, after Keating Natatorium opened on campus. The team has won district, sectional and citywide titles in every year since 1970, capturing 42 Ohio state championships during this span. In 2008, St. Charles Preparatory School of Columbus broke the Aquabombers' nine-year state title streak. The team has earned the distinction of Swimming World national high school swimming team champions in 1973, 1992, 2001, and 2017. From 1988 to 2015, head coach Jim Brower led the Aquabombers to 21 state titles, the most of any men's coach in Ohio high school history. The program produced Swimming World Magazine high school swimmers of the year Joe Hudepohl in 1992 and Jayme Cramer in 2001. Hudepohl was also a member of the United States Olympic Swim Team in 1992 and 1996 and still holds several school, state and national records in swimming. , junior Grant House holds a junior world record in the 4 × 200 m freestyle relay.

Football
In 1999, the Bombers football team appeared on Team Cheerios cereal boxes, alongside St. Ignatius High School, in recognition of the schools' football and community service programs, as well as their records in the National Merit Scholarship Program. On December 3, 2005, under Coach Steve Specht, the Bombers defeated Massillon Washington High School to earn the 2005 state football title, the first in team history, after having finished as state runners-up in 1992, 1998 and 2001. The Bombers ended their season with a perfect record: undefeated in the regular season and the playoffs. For this occasion, the City of Cincinnati declared December 14, 2005 "St. Xavier High School Day". In 2007, the Bombers were rated first or second high school football team nationally in a number of pre-season rankings; the same year, St. Xavier defeated DeMatha Catholic High School in a game nationally televised on ESPN. St. Xavier went on to win their second state championship that year in a 27–0 victory against Mentor High School, as well as the National Prep Poll's mythical national championship. The football program's national exposure continued with losses against Highlands High School on CSTV in 2009 and against Our Lady of Good Counsel High School the next year on ESPN. Specht won the 2013 Don Shula NFL High School Coach of the Year Award and joined the USA Football board of directors later that year. St. Xavier won its third football state championship on December 2, 2016, defeating St. Ignatius High School, 27–20, in double-overtime. With the win, the Bombers became the first Ohio high school football team to win a state championship after losing five games during the regular season.  On November 14, 2020, St. Xavier captured its fourth football state championship, defeating Pickerington Central 44–3, which set the record for the largest margin of victory in Ohio Division I state championship history.

, the Bombers are one of 15 football teams in the U.S. that wear GPS-based activity trackers developed by Catapult Sports to prevent injuries.

Other sports
St. Xavier won the state basketball championship in 2000 and finished as runners-up in the 2005 and 2007 state basketball tournament.

The Cross Country team has also enjoyed a great deal of success, winning Ohio High School Athletic Association (OHSAA) championships in 1998, 2000, 2003, 2012, 2013, and 2019 as well as runner-up finishes in 1999, 2009 and 2020. The team has been one of the most consistent teams in Ohio, having qualified to the OHSAA State Championship Race 29 of the past 30 years since 1987.

Since its founding in 2016, the TriBombers triathlon team has won three Ohio state championships and the 2019 USA Triathlon High School National Championship (Independent Club category).

Championship titles
, the Bombers have won 61 boys team Ohio High School Athletic Association (OHSAA) state titles, tied with St. Edward High School for the most by a single school in Ohio. Unless otherwise noted, the titles listed below were won at the Division I level.

St. Xavier's OHSAA-sponsored titles are:
 Cross country – 1998, 2000, 2003, 2012, 2013, 2019
 Baseball – 2003
 Basketball – 2000
 Football – 2005, 2007, 2016, 2020
 Golf – 1957, 1995, 2008, 2015, 2016
 Lacrosse – 2018 
 Soccer – 1983
 Swimming – 1970–1981 (12 consecutive), 1984, 1990–1995 (6), 1997, 1999–2007 (9), 2009–2021 (13)

Additionally, St. Xavier students have won state titles for singles or doubles Division I tennis in 1946, 1947, 2002, and 2006.

St. Xavier's non-OHSAA state titles include:
 Lacrosse (Ohio High School Lacrosse Association) – 1997,(DII) 2000,(DII) 2015
 Singles/doubles tennis – 1946, 1947, 2002, 2006
 Team tennis (Ohio Tennis Coaches' Association) – 2006–2009 (4 consecutive)
 Triathlon (USA Triathlon) – 2017–2019 (3 consecutive)
 Volleyball (Ohio High School Boys Volleyball Association) – 2003, 2006, 2019
 Water polo (Ohio High School Swim Coaches' Association) – 1979, 2015 2016

Non-state championship titles include:
 Saber fencing (Southwest Ohio Fencing Association League Championship) – 2012(DII)

The arts
St. Xavier's arts program is centered around three disciplines: performing arts (drama), visual arts, and musical arts. The drama and music disciplines are supplemented by a number of extracurricular programs.

Theatre Xavier
St. Xavier's co-ed drama group, Theatre Xavier''' (TX), organizes a drama or comedy each fall, a comedy each spring, and sometimes a smaller January production. St. Xavier students perform alongside students from a dozen public and Catholic high schools throughout the region. Of the 200–225 participants annually, 65%–70% are male. TX performs in the Walter C. Deye, S.J., Performance Center, a 510-seat thrust stage theater space whose size rivals many college theaters. It opened in 2004 as the St. Xavier Performance Center as part of a new fine arts wing. X-Box, an experimental theatre program, put on its inaugural production at the Edinburgh Festival Fringe in August 2018.

TX was directed by performing arts teacher Michele Mascari from 1982 to 2015. It participated in the Cappies of Greater Cincinnati from the awards program's founding in February 2002 through 2012. During that time, TX consistently led the city with 80 awards, including five for Best Musical and one for Best Play. Since 2013, TX has participated in The League of High School Theatres along with Anderson, Indian Hill, and Sycamore high schools.

Musical groups
St. Xavier sponsors a variety of musical programs, ranging from the marching band to a liturgical music group. The Marching Bombers perform at varsity football games.

Off the field, many St. Xavier students participate in musical groups that primarily perform at school concerts and national competitions. The jazz ensemble, known as Out of the Blue, is considered the St. Xavier select band. The wind ensemble consists of over 100 members. The string ensemble consists of two groups: Chamber Blues, made of bowed instruments, and a larger group called Men in Black that includes guitars.

Community service
In 1974, St. Xavier became one of the first Cincinnati-area high schools to incorporate service-learning into the curriculum, in response to Jesuit Superior-General Pedro Arrupe's call to "form men for others". Community service at St. Xavier is voluntary, in contrast to mandatory service hours at other area Catholic schools. Seventy-five to eighty percent of the student body voluntarily participates in community service programs.

The school's largest community service program is an Advent canned food drive, organized annually since 1926. Each year, students collect hundreds of thousands of pounds of food and delivers them directly to hundreds of families as well as to food pantries in Greater Cincinnati and rural Appalachia. In 2020, students collected  of food and distributed it to 25 food banks.

Student publications

The Blueprint, the school's student-run paper, is published monthly. Until 2007, the Blueprint was a member of the National Scholastic Press Association. It replaced the Xavier Prep, which was published until at least the 1940s. The Blueprint does not currently offer an online version. Additionally, St. Xavier is undergoing an initiative to organize and archive old editions of the Blueprint dating back into the 20th century.

The school's other two student publications are X-Ray, the annual yearbook, and Xpressions, a student literary magazine founded in 1964.

Other clubs
The St. Xavier Quiz Team, a member of the Greater Cincinnati Academic League (GCAL), has participated in many statewide tournaments under the direction of "Uncle" John F. Hussong, English teacher from 1964 to 2014, and history teacher Ron Weisbrod. The team made three runner-up finishes in the televised It's Academic Super Bowl championship in 1979, 1980, and 1981. The team won its first state championship in 1997, advancing to quarterfinals in the national Panasonic Academic Challenge. It made two runner-up finishes in the early 1990s and in 2001, losing to Beavercreek High School.

Notable people

Notable alumni

St. Xavier collectively refers to its graduates as the "Long Blue Line", after the school colors and the blue attire worn at graduation. The school's living graduates number over 18,000, . Many St. Xavier alumni are well-known figures in the Cincinnati area, and many others have gained recognition nationally and abroad as well. The following list includes those who completed the high school program at St. Xavier College between 1869 and 1934:

Arts and literature

 Kevin Allison (1988)comedic actor and writer
 David Bell (1988)suspense author
 Matt Berninger (1989)singer for The National
 Andy Blankenbuehler (1988)Broadway dancer and choreographer
 Christopher Bollen (1994)writer and novelist
 Phil DeGreg (1972)jazz pianist
 John Diehl (1968)actor
 Elliott Earlsgraphic designer and performance artist
 Joey Kern (1995)movie actor, most notably in Cabin Fever (2002), Grind (2003), and Super Troopers Kevin Kern (1992)Broadway performer in Les Misérables and Wicked John Knoepfle (1941)poet, translator, and educator
 Patrick Osborne (1999)Academy Award-winning film animator and director, Paperman and Feast David Quammen (1966)science writer

Athletics

 Alex Albright (2006)professional football linebacker, Dallas Cowboys
 Bryson Albright (2012)professional football linebacker, Cincinnati Bengals
 Bob Arnzen (1965)professional basketball and baseball player
 Jeff Berding (1985)president of FC Cincinnati and Cincinnati City Councilman (D)
 Dana Bible (1972)football coach, NC State Wolfpack
 Rocky Boiman (1998)professional football player and Super Bowl XLI champion, Tennessee Titans
 Neal Brady (c. 1915)pitcher for the New York Yankees and Cincinnati Reds
 Sean Clifford (2017), quarterback for the Penn State Nittany Lions
 Jayme Cramer (2001)bronze medalist in swimming at the 2003 Pan American Games and silver medalist at the 2006 FINA Short Course World Championships
 Steven Daniels (2011)professional football linebacker, Washington Commanders
 Greg Frey (1986)professional football player
 Clint Haslerig (1970)professional football player
 Jim Herman (1996)professional golfer
 Justin Hilliard (2015)professional football linebacker
 Paul Hove (1973)bronze medalist at the 1975 World Aquatics Championships
 Joe Hudepohl (1992)gold medalist at the 1992 and 1996 Olympic Games; swimming world record holder
 Brad Jaeger (2003)Indy Pro Series and Rolex Sports Car Series race car driver
 Melvin Johnson (1990)professional football player, Tampa Bay Buccaneers and Kansas City Chiefs
 Charles Keating III (1973)swimmer at the 1976 Olympic Games
 Luke Kuechly (2009)former professional football linebacker, Carolina Panthers
 Brad Loesing (2008)professional German basketball player
 Chris Mack (1988)head coach, Louisville Cardinals men's basketball
 Lemar Marshall (1995)professional football player, Cincinnati Bengals
 Mike Mathisprofessional basketball referee
 Art Mergenthal (1939)professional football player and 1945 NFL champion, Cleveland Rams
 Tom O'Brien (1966)head football coach, NC State Wolfpack
 Hal Pennington (1930)general manager and head coach, Cincinnati Bengals (second AFL)
 Dominic Randolph (2005)Arena Football League quarterback
 Kyle Ransom (2003)bronze medalist in swimming at the 2005 Summer Universiade
 George Ratterman (1944)professional football player
 Tom Rhoads (1963)professional football player, Buffalo Bills
 Shawn Rockey (1994)professional soccer midfielder, Cincinnati Kings and Cincinnati Riverhawks
 Pat Ross (2001)professional football player, Seattle Seahawks
 Greg Scruggs (2008)professional football tight end, New England Patriots
 Chris Sexton (1989)professional baseball player, Cincinnati Reds
 Bill Sweeney (1904)professional baseball player, Boston Doves
 Pat Todd (1998)semifinalist in the men's lightweight coxless four rowing event at the 2004 Summer Olympics and the same event at the 2008 Summer Olympics
 Dod Wales (1995)bronze medalist at the 1999 Pan Pacific Swimming Championships
 Chris Welsh (1973)broadcaster and former professional baseball player
 Charles Wolf (1944)former professional basketball coach

Business

 John F. Barrett CEO of Western & Southern Financial Group
 James Michael Lafferty (1981) CEO of Fine Hygienic Holding and former regional CEO of Procter & Gamble, Coca-Cola, and British American Tobacco

Clergy

 Most Rev. Edward L. Fedders (c. 1928)Bishop of Juli, Peru
 Rev. Francis Xavier Lasance (c. 1875)devotional writer
 Most Rev. Henry K. Moeller (c. 1868)Archbishop of Cincinnati
 Most Rev. Anthony John King Mussio (1920)Bishop of Steubenville, Ohio
 Most Rev. Henry Richter (c. 1854)Bishop of Grand Rapids, Michigan

Education

 Roger Kanet (1954)political scientist, University of Miami
 Philip J. Pauly (1968)historian of science and professor at Rutgers University
 Joel M. Podolny (1982)sociologist and former dean of the Yale School of Management; Apple Inc. executive

Law and crime

 Michael R. Barrett (1969)United States federal judge, Southern District of Ohio
 Joe Deters (1975) Ohio Supreme Court Justice 
 Patrick F. Fischer (1976)Ohio Supreme Court justice
 Thomas Geoghegan (1967)labor lawyer and author
 Charles H. Keating Jr. (1941)lawyer, real estate developer, banker, and financier, convicted of fraud in the 1989 Savings and Loan scandal, after whom the Keating Five were named
 Joseph Peter Kinneary (1924)United States federal judge, Southern District of Ohio
 Simon L. Leis Jr. (1952)Hamilton County Prosecutor (1971–1983), Common Pleas Judge (1983–1987), and Sheriff (1987–2012)
 Robert O. Lukowsky (1945)Kentucky Supreme Court justice

Media
 James W. Faulkner (c. 1881)newspaperman and political writer, "Dean of Ohio Correspondents"; founder of and first president of the Ohio Legislative Correspondents Association
 William J. Keating (1945)U.S. House of Representatives (R–OH), 1971–1974, former publisher of The Cincinnati Enquirer'' and chairman of the board for Gannett Company and the Associated Press
 Joe Kernen (1974)CNBC news anchor
 Gustave Reiningertelevision screenwriter

Medicine
 Francis M. Forster (1930)neurologist and dean of the Georgetown University School of Medicine
 Vivek Ramaswamy (2003)founder of Axovant Sciences and Roivant Sciences
 Branimir Ivan Sikic (1964)oncologist and cancer pharmacologist, Stanford University School of Medicine

Military
 Robert Henry Doolan (1935)Army Air Force navigator and prisoner of war
 John Herman Hoefker (1937)World War II flying ace

Politics

 Tom Brinkman (c. 1975)Ohio State Representative (R – 34), 2001–2008
 Jim Bunning (1949)U.S. Senator (R–KY), 1999–2011; U.S. Representative (R–KY), 1987–1999; Hall of Fame professional baseball player
 John D. Carroll (1973)Ohio State Representative (D–13), 1985
 John Cranley (1992)Mayor of Cincinnati
 Chip Cravaack (1977)U.S. Representative (R–MN), 2011–2013
 John J. Gilligan (1939)Ohio Governor (D), 1971–1975; father of Health and Human Services Secretary Kathleen Sebelius
 Greg J. Holbrock (c. 1924)U.S. Representative (D–OH), 1941–1943
 Eric Kearney (1981)Ohio State Senator (D–9)
 Bill Kraus (1965)gay rights and AIDS activist
 Robert Mecklenborg (1970)Ohio State Representative (R–30), 2007–2011
 Peter Stautberg (1982)Ohio State Representative (R–34)
 Brad Wenstrup (1976)U.S. Representative (R–OH)

Notable faculty and staff
Rev. Lawrence Biondi, S.J. (1965–1967)then a French and Latin teacher; president of Saint Louis University 1987–2013
 John Dromo (1942–1947)then a coach of "nearly everything" at the school; later the Louisville Cardinals men's basketball head coach
 Michael Gallagherthen a Jesuit scholastic teaching English; later an author and translator of Japanese literature
 Robert S. Johnston (1901–1902)classics, English, and mathematics teacher; later president of Saint Louis University
 Urban Meyer (1985)then interning as a defensive back football coach at St. Xavier; former Ohio State Buckeyes football head coach
 Dan J. Savage (1926–1931)football and baseball coach; previously Saint Louis Billikens football, basketball, and baseball coach
 Rev. Robert A. Wild, S.J. (1964–1967)then a Latin, Greek, and speech and debate teacher; later president of Marquette University

Other notable people
Nick Clooney (honorary 1952)journalist and politician
Bo Donaldson (1964–1967)musician
Paris Johnson Jr. (2016–2018)American football offensive tackle, Ohio State Buckeyes
Al Schottelkotte (late 1940s)news anchor
Admiral Schlei (1890s)baseball player
Jim Tarbellrestaurateur and politician

See also
 List of Jesuit sites

Further reading

Notes and references

External links

 
 Official athletics website

 
Boys' schools in Ohio
Private schools in Cincinnati
High schools in Hamilton County, Ohio
Educational institutions established in 1831
Jesuit high schools in the United States
Xavier University
Catholic secondary schools in Ohio
Roman Catholic Archdiocese of Cincinnati
1831 establishments in Ohio